A2A S.p.A. is an Italian company, organised as a società per azioni, that generates, distributes, and markets renewable energy, electricity, gas, integrated water supply, and waste management services.  The company has significant presence in the North of Italy, energy production facilities in Italy and Greece. A2A was born out of the merger of two independent Italian city-owned companies, AEM (Azienda Energetica Municipale) of Milan and ASM Brescia (Azienda dei Servizi Municipalizzati), at the end of 2007, and is still partially owned by the Municipalities of Milan and Brescia (25% ownership each) which are also responsible of appointed 12 out of its 15 directors. A2A is listed on the Borsa Italiana and is a member of the FTSE MIB index.

References

Italian companies established in 2007
Electric power companies of Italy
Companies based in Milan
Waste management companies of Italy